The 12621 / 12622 Tamil Nadu Express  is a superfast train of the Indian Railways.

Accidents
Tamil Nadu Express has traditionally been accident-prone, with many accidents occurring due to its speed which when inaugurated had a top speed of 130kph with orange coaches matching Rajdhani Exp. The top speed of the train was reduced after series of derailments and after major derailment of 14 coaches on 31 August 1981 at Asifabad Road Station in Telangana, in which 15 persons were killed and 39 injured. The following table enlists the accidents that happened on Tamil Nadu Express.

See also
 Ganga Kaveri Express
 Dedicated Intercity trains of India
 The Grand Trunk Express
 Chennai Duronto Express
 Chennai Rajdhani Express
 Kerala Express
 Karnataka Express
 Andhra Pradesh Express
 Visakhapatnam Swarna Jayanti Express
 Samata Express
 Hirakud Express

References

External links
 
 

Named passenger trains of India
Railway services introduced in 1976
Express trains in India
Rail transport in Tamil Nadu
Rail transport in Andhra Pradesh
Rail transport in Telangana
Rail transport in Maharashtra
Rail transport in Madhya Pradesh
Rail transport in Uttar Pradesh
Rail transport in Delhi
Transport in Delhi
Transport in Chennai